Textile geometry is the creative and technical process by which thread or yarn fibers are woven together or interlaced to form a flexible, functional, and decorative cloth or fabric which is subsequently printed upon or otherwise adorned. Textile design is further broken down into three major disciplines, printed textile design, woven textile design, and mixed media textile design, each of which use different methods to produce a surface ornamented fabric for variable uses and markets. Textile Design as a practice has evolved to become an industry integral to other disciplines such as fashion, interior design, and fine arts.

Overview 
Textile designing is a field that includes fashion design, carpet manufacturing and any other cloth-related field. Clothing, carpets, drapes, and towels are all functional products resulting from textile design. Textile design has influenced other works or trends in the field of art.

Textile design requires understanding of the technical aspects of production and the properties of fiber, yarn, and dyes.

Textile design disciplines

Printed Textile Design 

Printed textile designs are produced by the application of various printing processes to fabric or cloth and other media, Printed textile design, woven textile design, and mixed media textile design are the three major disciplines of textile design, each of which uses distinct ways to create a surface embellished fabric for a variety of uses and markets, namely: resist printing, relief printing, rotogravure, screen printing, transfer printing, and digital printing. These processes use various inks and dyes to imprint aesthetic, often repeating patterns, motifs, and styles onto the fabric or cloth. Printed textile designers are predominantly and inextricably involved with home interior design (designing patterns for carpets, wallpapers, or even ceramics), the fashion and clothing industries, and the paper industry (designing stationary or gift wrap).

There are numerous established and enduring printed styles and designs that can be broken down into four major categories: floral, geometric, world cultures, and conversational. Floral designs include flowers, plants, or any botanical theme. Geometric designs feature themes both inorganic and abstract such as tessellations. Designs surrounding world cultures may be traced to a specific geographic, ethnic, or anthropological source. Finally, conversational designs are designs that fit less easily into the other categories: they may be described as presenting "imagery that references popular icons of a particular time period or season, or which is unique and challenges our perceptions in some way." Each category contains sundry, more specific individual styles and designs.

Different clothes, moreover, require different dyes: for example, silk, wool, or other protein-based fabrics require acidic dyes based whereas synthetic fabrics require specialized disperse dyes.

The advent of computer-aided design software, such as Adobe Photoshop or Illustrator, has allowed each discipline of textile design to evolve and innovate new practices and processes, but has most influenced the production of printed textile designs. Most prominently, digital tools have made the process of creating repeating patterns or motifs, or repeats, much more effective and simple. Repeats are used to create patterns both visible and invisible to the eye: geometric patterns are intended to depict clear, intentional patterns, whereas floral or organic designs, for instance, are intended to create unbroken repeats that are ideally undetectable. Digital tools have also aided in making better patterns by easing up an issue called "tracking", where the eye is inadvertently drawn to parts of textiles that expose the discontinuity of the textile and reveal its pattern. These tools, alongside the innovation of digital inkjet printing, have allowed the textile printing process to become faster, more scalable, and sustainable.

Woven Textile Design 
Woven textile design originates from the practice of weaving which produces fabric by interlacing a vertical yarn (warp) and a horizontal yarn (weft), most often at right angles. Woven textile designs are created by various types of looms and are now predominantly produced using a mechanized or computerized jacquard loom.Designs within the context of weaving are created using various types of yarns, using variance in texture, size, and color to construct a stylized patterned or monochromatic fabric. There are a large range of yarn types available to the designer, including but not limited to: cotton, twill, linen, and synthetic fibers. In order to produce the woven fabric, the designer first delineates and visualizes the sequence of threading which is traditionally drawn out on graph paper known as a point paper.

The designer also will choose a weave structure which governs the aesthetic design that will be produced. The most common process is a plain weave, in which the yarns interlace in an alternating, tight formation producing a strong and flexible multi-use fabric. Twill weaves, which are also common, alternatively use diagonal lines created by floating the warp or the weft to the left or the right. This process creates a softer fabric favored by designers in the fashion and clothing design industries. Common and recognizable twill styles include patterns like houndstooth or herringbone.

Beyond weave structure, color is another dominant aspect governing woven textile design. Typically, designers choose two or more contrasting colors that will be woven into patterns based on the designer's chosen threading sequence. Color is also dependent on the size of the yarn: fine yarns will produce a fabric that may change colors when it receives light from different angles whereas larger yarns will generally produce a more monochromatic surface.

Mixed Media Textile Design 

Mixed media textiles designs are produced using embroidery or other various fabric manipulation processes such as pleating, appliqué, quilting, and laser cutting.

Embroidery is traditionally performed by hand, applying myriad stitches of thread to construct designs and patterns on the textile surface. Similar to printed textile design, embroidery affords the designer a vast amount of artistic and aesthetic control. Typical stitches include but are not limited to the cross stitch, the chain stitch, and couching.  Although industrial and mechanized embroidery has become the standard, hand stitching still remains a fixture for fine arts textiles.

Quilting, traditionally used to enhance the insulation and warmth of a textile, also provides the designer the opportunity to apply aesthetic properties. Most commonly quilts feature geometric and collage designs formed from a various textiles of different textures and colors. Quilting also frequently employs the use of recycled scrap or heirloom fabrics. Quilts are also often used as medium for an artist to depict a personal or communal narrative: for example, the Hmong people have a tradition of creating story quilts or cloths illustrating their experiences with immigration to the United States from Eastern and Southeastern Asia.

Environmental impact 
The practice and industry of textile design present environmental concerns. From the production of cloth from raw material, to dyeing and finishing, and finally the ultimate disposal of products, each step of the process produces environmental implications that have proliferated with the emergence of fast fashion and other modern industrial practices.

Predominantly, these environmental impacts stem from the heavy use of hazardous chemicals involved in each step of the textile creation process which must be properly disposed of. Other considerations involve the amount of waste created by the disposal of textile design products and the reclamation and re-use of recyclable textiles. The Environmental Protection Agency reported that over 15 million tons of textile waste is created annually. This consists of some 5% of all municipal waste generated and only 15% of that waste is recovered and reused.

The existence of negative environmental impacts due to textile production has resulted in new technologies and practices of textile design. Textile designs involving the use of synthetic dyes and materials can result in harmful effects on the environment. This has caused a shift towards using natural dyes or materials and research towards other mediums that do not harm the environment. This research includes testing new ways to collect natural resources and how these natural resources work with other materials.

Electronic textiles or e-textiles are a new innovation towards eco-friendly textile design. Electronic textiles involve items of clothing with electronic devices or technology weaved into the fabric unnoticeably. These textiles are tested for efficiency and recyclability and have a main priority of being eco-friendly. These new approaches to textile design result in strides towards lowering negative environmental impact from textiles and improving overall recyclability and usage of these pieces.

These concerns have led to the birth of sustainable textile design movements and the practice of ecological design within the field. For instance, London's Royal Society of the Arts hosts design competitions that compel all entrants to center their design and manufacturing methods around sustainable practices and materials.

Textile Design In Different Cultures 

Methods, patterns, designs, and importance regarding textiles vary from culture to culture. Those from countries in Africa use textiles as a large form of expression of their culture and way of life. They use textiles to liven up the interior of a space or accentuate and decorate the body of an individual. Whether for a piece of clothing or a rug, the textile designs of African cultures involve the process of strip-woven fibers that can repeat a pattern or vary from strip to strip.

History 
The history of textile design goes back thousands of years. Because of the perishability of textiles, early examples of textile design are rare. However, some of the oldest known examples of textiles found were discovered in the form of nets and basketry and date from Neolithic cultures in 5000 BCE. When trade networks formed in European countries, silk, wool, cotton, and flax fiber textiles became valuable commodities. Many early cultures including Egyptian, Chinese, African, and Peruvian practiced early weaving techniques. One of the oldest examples of textile design was found from an ancient Siberian tomb in 1947. The tomb was said to be that of a prince's and is aged back from 464 ABD; making the tomb and all of its contents over 2500 years old. The rug, known as the Pazyryk rug, was preserved in ice all those years and is detailed with elaborate deer and men riding on horseback. The designs are similar to present day Anatolian and Persian rugs that apply the directly proportional Ghiordes knot in the weaving. The rug is currently displayed at the Hermitage Museum located in St. Petersburg, Russia.

See also
 Clothing technology
 Fashion design
 Textile manufacturing
 Importance of textile design

Notes

References 
 Billie J. Collier, Martin J. Bide, and Phyllis G., Understanding of Textiles, Pearson Publishers, 2009, 
Bowles, Melanie, 1961- (2012). Digital textile design. Isaac, Ceri. (2nd ed.). London: Laurence King Pub. . OCLC 866622297
 Briggs-Goode, A. (Amanda). Printed textile design. London. . OCLC 898176484.
 Calamari, Sage; Hyllegard, Karen H. (2016-07-07). "An exploration of designers' perspectives on human health and environmental impacts of interior textiles". Textiles and Clothing Sustainability. 2 (1): 9. doi:10.1186/s40689-016-0020-7. ISSN 2197-9936
Clarke, Simon, 1963-. Textile design. London [England]. . OCLC 908338301.
 Gale, Colin, Lajwanti Lahori, and Jasbir Kaur, The Textile Book, Berg Publishers, 2002, 
 Jackson, Lesley : Twentieth-Century Pattern Design, Princeton Architectural Press, New York, 2002. 
 Jackson, Lesley :  Shirley Craven and Hull Traders: Revolutionary Fabrics and Furniture 1957-1980, ACC Editions, 2009, 
Jenkins, David, ed.: The Cambridge History of Cambridge, UK: Cambridge University Press, 2003, 
 Kadolph, Sara J., ed.: Textiles, 10th edition, Pearson/Prentice-Hall, 2007, 
Labillois, Tabitha M., ed.: "the meow institute", Mexico, 1756. 
 Rothstein, Natalie: The Victoria and Albert Museum's Textile Collection: Woven Textile Design in Britain to 1750, Canopy Books, New York, London, and Paris, 1994.  
 Rothstein, Natalie: The Victoria and Albert Museum's Textile Collection: Woven Textile Design in Britain 1750 to 1850, Canopy Books, New York, London, and Paris, 1994. 
Russel, Alex.The Fundamentals of Printed Textile Design, AVA Publishing SA Distributed by Thames & Hudson (ex-North America) Distributed in the USA & Canada by: English Language Support Office, doi:10.5040/9781474218535.ch-001, 
Shenton, Jan. Woven textile design. Ridsdale, Eleanor,. London [England]. . OCLC 884590266.
Miraftab, M., and A R. Horrocks. Ecotextiles The Way Forward for Sustainable Development in Textiles. Burlington: Elsevier Science, 2007. Print.
  Schevill, Margot. Evolution in Textile Design from the Highlands of Guatemala : Seventeen Male Tzutes, or Headdresses, from Chichicastenango in the Collections of the Lowie Museum of Anthropology, University of California, Berkeley . Berkeley, Calif: Lowie Museum of Anthropology, University of California, Berkeley, 1985. Print.
  Robinson, Stuart. A History of Printed Textiles: Block, Roller, Screen, Design, Dyes, Fibres, Discharge, Resist, Further Sources for Research. London: Studio Vista, 1969. Print.
  Speelberg, Femke. "Fashion & Virtue : Textile Patterns and the Print Revolution, 1520–1620". Metropolitan Museum of Art Bulletin. New York: Metropolitan Museum of Art, 2015. Print.
  Perivoliotis, Margaret C. "The Role of Textile History in Design Innovation: A Case Study Using Hellenic Textile History". Textile history 36.1 (2005): 1–19. Web.
  Grömer, Karina. The Art of Prehistoric Textile Making. Naturhistorisches Museum Wien, 2016. Web.
European Textile Forum, In Hopkins, H., In Kania, K., & European Textile Forum. (2019). Ancient textiles, modern science II.
In Siennicka, M., In Rahmstorf, L., & In Ulanowska, A. (2018). First textiles: The beginnings of textile manufacture in Europe and the Mediterranean : proceedings of the EAA Session held in Istanbul (2014) and the 'First Textiles' Conference in Copenhagen (2015)''.
Whewell, Charles S. and Abrahart, Edward Noah. "Textile". Encyclopædia Britannica, 4 Jun. 2020, https://www.britannica.com/topic/textile. Accessed 7 March 2021.
Gesimondo, Nancy and Postell, Jim. "Materiality and Interior Construction". John Wiley & Sons, 2011,